Tao is a word in Polynesian languages and can have a number of different meanings.

In Samoan and Māori, a tao is a long traditional wooden spear.

The word also has another meaning in the Samoan language; tao also means 'to bake' or 'roast' in a traditional oven made of hot rocks above ground.

References

External links
 Tao in the collection of the Museum of New Zealand Te Papa Tongarewa

Ceremonial weapons
Spears
Māori weapons
Māori words and phrases
New Zealand martial arts
Polearms
Samoan words and phrases